Hi-5 is an Australian children's television series, originally produced by Kids Like Us and later Southern Star for the Nine Network and created by Helena Harris and Posie Graeme-Evans. The program is known for its educational content, and for the cast of the program, who became a recognised musical group for children outside of the series, known collectively as Hi-5. It has generated discussion about what is considered appropriate television for children. The series premiered on 12 April 1999 on the Nine Network. 

The series is designed for a pre-school audience, featuring five performers who educate and entertain through music, movement and play. Music is an integral part of the series with the group's pop appeal resonating in the program. The segments of the show are based on an educational model. The original cast was composed of Kellie Crawford, Kathleen de Leon Jones, Nathan Foley, Tim Harding and Charli Robinson. This line-up had been completely phased out by the end of 2008 and were replaced with a new line-up of performers. Hi-5 received three Logie Television Awards for Most Outstanding Children's Program.

Harris and Graeme-Evans ended their involvement with the series in 2008 when the program was sold to Southern Star and the Nine Network. The final episode of Hi-5 aired on 16 December 2011 as a result of the Nine Network selling the property in 2012. A spin-off series, Hi-5 House, aired on Nick Jr. from 2013 to 2016, produced with no involvement from Nine. 

Nine renewed its partnership with the Hi-5 franchise in October 2016 and announced plans to revive Hi-5 with a new cast. The revived series premiered on 9Go! on 15 May 2017.

Series overview

Original series

Revived series

Original series (1999–2011)

Series 1 (1999)

Series 2 (2000)

Series 3 (2001)

Series 4 (2002)

Series 5 (2003)

Series 6 (2004)

Series 7 (2005)

Series 8 (2006)

Series 9 (2007)

Series 10 (2008)

Series 11 (2009)

Series 12 (2010)

Series 13 (2011)

Revived series (2017)

Series 1 (2017)

Notes

References

Lists of Australian children's television series episodes